Jacques-René de Brisay de Denonville, Marquis de Denonville (10 December 1637 – 22 September 1710) was Governor General of New France from 1685 to 1689 and was a key figure in the Beaver Wars.

Replacing Joseph Antoine de LaBarre in 1685, he arrived in New France on 1 August 1685.  Denonville set out to make King Louis XIV proud. The Iroquois Confederacy had been a nuisance for half a century, hampering New France's efforts to establish itself as a profitable colony.

Although France and England were at peace, in June 1686, Denonville sent Sieur de Troyes north from Montreal with a hundred men (most likely the French Marines in Canada, to capture the English fur trading posts on Hudson Bay. The victory was swift and profitable; word of the French attack would not reach the English for months. Denonville then set out with a well-organized force to Fort Frontenac, where they met with the 50 hereditary sachems of the Iroquois Confederacy from their Onondaga council fire. These 50 chiefs constituted the entire decision-making strata of the Iroquois. They had been lulled into meeting under a flag of truce. Denonville seized, chained, and shipped the 50 Iroquois chiefs to Marseilles, France, to be used as galley slaves.

In 1687, Denonville launched a well-organized campaign against the Senecas. The expedition left Montreal on June 13, 1687 and consisted of 832 colonial regulars, over 900 Canadian militia, and some 400 Indian allies. They traveled by water in 200 batteaux and 200 canoes. Louis-Henri de Baugy, Chevalier de Baugy accompanied the force, and kept a journal of his experiences.  The force landed at Irondequoit Bay, built a palisade to protect the boats, and on July 12 began the march to Ganondagan. On July 13, the French were attacked by a Seneca force of 800, but after a short engagement "they soon resolved to fly." Denonville described the French casualties as 5 or 6 killed and 20 wounded, while the Seneca casualties were 45 killed and 60 wounded. Upon arrival at the village on the 14th, "we found it burned" and a nearby fort abandoned. A vast quantity of hogs were killed, and 1.2 million bushels of stored and standing corn were destroyed. The force then turned west and destroyed the village of Totiakton (now in the town of Mendon) before subsequently returning to their boats at Irondequoit. The Seneca material losses were replaced thereafter and new villages were formed.

Before Denonville returned his forces to New France, he travelled down the shore of Lake Ontario and created Fort Denonville at the site where the Niagara River meets Lake Ontario. This site was previously used by La Salle for a fort named Fort Conti from 1678 to 1679, and was later used for Fort Niagara, which still exists.

Denonville then asked the King for more men to combat the Iroquois Confederacy, who were in a constant guerrilla warfare with the Canadien settlements. With a coalition forming against France, no more troops could be spared for Canada. In 1688, hostilities between England and France resumed and the Iroquois were informed of this. Denonville proposed to assault New York by land and sea and requested to be recalled to France due to sickness. Frontenac was sent with an expedition that left La Rochelle but did not reach Québec until mid-October. In the meantime, Iroquois warriors struck the Canadien settlements near Montreal. Fifty-six farms were destroyed and more than a hundred Canadiens were killed or captured. Denonville had his regulars dispersed to towns across the land, attempting to protect the homes and families of the Canadien. Forts were abandoned. The Iroquois destroyed farmsteads and whole families were slaughtered or captured. On August 4, 1689, Lachine, a small town adjacent to Montreal, was burned to the ground. Fifteen hundred Iroquois warriors had been harassing Montreal defences for many months prior. Denonville's tenure was followed by the return of Frontenac, who replaced Denonville as governor for the next nine years (1689–1698). Frontenac had been arranging a new plan of attack to mitigate the effects of the Iroquois in North America and realized the true danger the imprisonment of the sachems created. He located the 13 surviving leaders, and they returned with him to New France in October 1698.

When Denonville had returned to France, the king continued to show his confidence in Jacques-René by appointing him a tutor to the children of the royal household.

Anniversary medal 

A medal commemorating the 250th anniversary of the 1687 Denonville Expedition was created by the Rochester Numismatic Association in 1937.  The medal obverse has an image of the Marquis de Denonville while the medal reverse shows the timeline and path of the expedition.

See also 

 Henri de Tonti

References 

 William J. Eccles, "Brisay de Denonville, Jacques-René de, Marquis de Denonville", Dictionary of Canadian Biography (Toronto: University of Toronto/Université Laval, 2000).
 the Canadian Encyclopedia - Biography

1637 births
1710 deaths
French explorers
Governors of New France
17th-century Canadian politicians